Stanhopea warszewicziana is a species of orchid found from Costa Rica to western Panama.

References

External links 

warszewicziana
Orchids of Costa Rica
Orchids of Panama
Taxa named by Johann Friedrich Klotzsch